Dziennik Zachodni (Western Daily, DZ) is a regional Polish newspaper distributed in Upper Silesia. Its headquarters is located in the city of Sosnowiec. Established in February 1945 by Stanisław Ziemba, it was initially a state-held daily. Taken over by Polskapresse company, itself a part of the Verlagsgruppe Passau, it is currently the best selling regional newspaper in Poland with an average of 109,000 copies sold daily. Following the 2004 merger with Trybuna Śląska daily, it is also one of the largest. The main issue is published daily in approximately 326,000 copies, with a set of add-ins devoted to sports and labour (Mondays), education (Tuesdays), motorization (Wednesdays), household (Thursdays), health and travels (Saturdays).

Notable contributors 
Notable contributors include:
Krystyna Bochenek - Polish senator and journalist
Jan Miodek - professor, language expert of Poland-wide fame
Stanisław Janicki - film director, critic
Tadeusz Pieronek - bishop, theologist
Kazimierz Kutz - film director
Tomasz Lis - journalist and TV personality
Gwidon Miklaszewski
Tigran Vardikyan

Daily newspapers published in Poland
Mass media in Katowice
Newspapers established in 1945
Polish news websites